Lyngdal Idrettslag is a local sports club from Lyngdal. It is the youth club of Ingvild Stensland, former captain of the Norway women's national football team.

Lyngdal Idrettslag takes part in football, handball, volleyball, basketball, orienteering, athletics, and other sports.

Lyngdal's men's football team in playing in the Fourth Division, the fifth tier of Norwegian football, after being promoted from the Fourth Division in 2012. Former players include Espen Hægeland, Raymond Hofstædter, Stefan Strandberg,  Jakob Ertzeid Toft and Zlatko Tripić. Lyngdal's women's handball team plays in the fourth division.

References

External links 
 Lyngdal Idrettslag
 Lyngdal Idrettslag's football team

Sport in Vest-Agder
Football clubs in Norway
Sports teams in Norway
1934 establishments in Norway